Miguel Iglesias Pino de Arce was born on 11 June 1830 in Cajamarca, Peru, and died on 7 November 1909 in Lima, Peru. He was a Peruvian soldier, general, and politician who served as the 26th President of Peru (Regenerator President of the Republic) from 1882 to 1885.

Life
The original name of his family was de la Iglesia. Their ancestor was Captain Álvaro de la Iglesia, who fought against the Moors in Spain in the 8th century. Lorenzo Iglesias Espinach left his hometown of Solivella in Catalonia in the early 19th century to join three uncles on his mother's side who had founded the Chota silver mine, near the town of Cajamarca, in the county of the same name, in northern Peru, in 1780. Lorenzo Iglesias Espinach became both the heir of his uncles and sub-Prefect of Cajamarca; he was a friend of Simón Bolívar, who stayed with him in Cajamarca and was one of the groups of dissident Spanish colonists who supported independence from Spain. In 1820 Lorenzo Iglesias married Rosa Pino, and their son, Miguel, was born ten years later.

Miguel Iglesias Pino, later General and President, known to posterity as "El Pacificador", inherited a  estate from his forebears as well as lucrative silver mines. His power in the town of Cajamarca and the surrounding area was that of a feudal magnate, and he had been recruiting troops with his own money—effectively a private army—since the 1866 war with Spain. He had been one of the senior army officers present at the Peruvian victory on the "Dos de mayo", was given the rank of Colonel, and was named Prefect of Cajamarca. In 1874, Iglesias initiated a revolution against the government of President Manuel Pardo and proclaimed himself the political and military Chief of the North. Even though Iglesias's rebellion was a failure, he was not brought to account because no one in Lima dared to confront the power of Iglesias in Cajamarca. Thus, Iglesias was able to consolidate his position in his northern Peruvian fiefdom. When war broke out in 1879, between a coalition of Peru allied with Bolivia, ranged against Chile, Iglesias commenced raising a new private militia.

The war, now known as the War of the Pacific, quickly began to go wrong for Peru. In the campaign of November 1879, the Peruvian Navy lost their two most important warships, the iron-clad Independencia was sunk by the corvette Covadonga, and the iron-clad Huascar was captured by the iron-clads Cochrane and Blanco Encalada, which had been supplied to Chile and Peru by British shipyards; the southern department of Tarapacá was overrun, and the professional Peruvian army was broken. Subsequently, Iglesias's friend, Nicolás de Piérola, launched a successful coup d'état, declaring himself Supreme Commander in Chief. On 23 December 1879, he replaced President Prado, who was considered to have mismanaged the conduct of the war thus far. One of the battalions lending their armed support to Pierola was Iglesias's "Vencedores de Cajamarca", and Pierola appointed Iglesias as Secretary of War in his new government.

Iglesias personally took charge of organizing the defense of the Peruvian capital city against the advancing Chileans in January 1881. Iglesias's principal defensive lines were at the Morro Solar, a hill south of Lima. He had 5000 men, mostly recruited from Cajamarca, who had been trained and armed by him at his own expense to defend Lima. After the Peruvian Second Division had been forced to retreat from San Juan, the battle for Lima concentrated on the Morro Solar. The first Chilean assault on the hill was repulsed, but Chilean reinforcements and artillery were brought up. Iglesias found himself surrounded and outnumbered by 9000 Chilean troops and came under a withering barrage. Because the professional Peruvian army had previously been decimated in the south, losing much of its most modern equipment in the process, Iglesias had only primitive, Peruvian-manufactured rifles that were without adequate sights and were inferior to the Chilean Krupps. Of the men who defended the Morro Solar, only 280 were taken, prisoner. Among those killed was General Iglesias's son Alejandro, aged 22. Miguel Iglesias was taken prisoner along with Carlos de Pierola, the brother of the President, and Guillermo Billinghurst, Secretary of State. These three men and other critical Peruvian notables were about to be shot by a firing squad on the orders of a Chilean sergeant who did not believe in keeping prisoners alive. Just in time, Billinghurst stepped out of the execution line and persuaded the sergeant that he would do better to take them as prisoners to the Chilean commander, General Baquedano. Billinghurst and Iglesias were later Presidents of Peru, instead of corpses—such as Providence.

After the defeat of the Morro Solar, Chile did not recognize Pierola as President and replaced him with a puppet in Lima's presidential palace. Having escaped back to Cajamarca, Iglesias continued the war against Chile in the north of Peru, while General Andrés Avelino Cáceres fought against the Chileans in the Andes. On the Morro Solar, Iglesias had declared "I will not give in; I will fight while I can" and now saw his mission as "to search out and defeat the enemy wherever we meet him". He achieved a victory over the Chileans at San Pablo, Cajamarca, on 13 July 1882, but soon afterward, a Chilean force reoccupied the region and carried out brutal reprisals. Following this, Iglesias became convinced that the war had to be brought to an end if Peru was not to be completely devastated.

Peruvian historians have severely judged Iglesias because he represented blunt reality as he saw the fundamental question was whether Peru would exist as a nation. Iglesias saw that a few more years of prolonged occupation of Peru by Chile would render Peru a colony of Chile rather than a sovereign nation. Because he saw this clearly, he decided to convene a congress of the northern departments of Peru to proclaim him President of the whole country and empower him with authority to negotiate with the Chileans. With this claim to the presidency recognized by Chile, Iglesias proceeded to the small seaside resort of Ancón, a short distance from Lima, to fulfill his grim mission of statesmanship. On 23 October 1883, Iglesias signed the Treaty of Ancón on behalf of Peru, thereby ending the hostilities. The Treaty had fourteen clauses. Peru paid with Tarapacá as war reparations while the southern department of Arica and Tacna was to decide in a referendum, to be held ten years hence, whether it wanted to join Chile or remain part of Peru.

When he signed the Treaty of Ancón, Miguel Iglesias expected that his efforts to spare Peru further suffering, in a lost cause, would be rewarded with popular gratitude. It took him almost two years to understand that most Peruvians could not admire the man who had made himself the symbol of their resounding defeat. Iglesias initiated the restoration of the national library, which the Chileans had sacked, but he did not discover a formula for rebuilding Peru's political institutions. Unable to win allies through the judicious use of money because of the depleted state of the national treasury, Iglesias turned to increasingly repressive measures to silence the opposition, and his opponents fought back. On 27 August 1884, guerrilla fighters launched an armed assault against Lima and almost managed to fight their way into the presidential palace. The tenacious defense of Iglesias threw back the attackers at the last barricade, but they returned to the outskirts of Lima just over a year later. This time large numbers of the ordinary citizens of Lima decided to throw in their lot with the guerrillas, and Iglesias realized the full degree to which he lacked popular support. Choosing to avoid further bloodshed, Iglesias renounced the presidency in December 1885, took refuge on an Italian ship, and eventually reached his estate of Udima in Cajamarca.

Iglesias had decided to retire from political life and dedicate himself to farming. However, the new Peruvian government wanted to see him out of the country and thereby severed from the Cajamarca power base from which Iglesias had been able repeatedly to relaunch himself in the past. It was insinuated that Iglesias should leave Peru, and in 1886 he and his wife Maria (daughter of Manuel Alonso de Posadas) went into exile in Europe. They took a retinue of servants and socialized for two years in Madrid and Paris. In 1888 the ban against Iglesias was lifted, and he and his wife were able to return to Peru. President Caceres reinstated Iglesias as a General with full pay and sent the news to him by special messenger. However, in general terms, Peru remained impoverished by its defeat in war. It could only afford to give Iglesias a small engraved wooden box from the Peruvian nation by way of thanks for all the troops that he had paid for in the War of the Pacific.

A few years later, in 1895, the people of Cajamarca voted Iglesias in as their Senator in an uncontested election. Iglesias and his wife had eleven children, and 1895 was also the year that the General's youngest daughter, Gaudencia, married a Scot named Edgar Fraser Luckie, who had made a fortune from gold mining in British Guiana and then bought the Andahuasi sugar farming estate near Sayan, north of Lima.

Exhumation and reburial to Peruvian Crypt of Heroes in 2011

Forgiven and admired, Iglesias's memory was resurrected in Peru, on 20 July 2011, after 102 years at rest; President and General Iglesias Pino de Arce was exhumed to a new coffin and subsequently moved and reinterred in the Cripta de Los Heroes in Lima.

See also
 List of presidents of Peru

References

1830 births
1909 deaths
 Presidents of Peru
 Peruvian military personnel of the War of the Pacific